Akhtar Sheerani (born Muhammad Dawood Khan; 4 May 1905 – 9 September 1948; also spelled Sheerani or Sherani) was an Urdu poet. He was a romantic poet of the Urdu language.

Early life and career
Akhtar Shairani was born on 4 May 1905 as Muhammad Dawood Khan to the Pashtun Sherani tribe, Shirani tribe which had come to India with Sultan Mahmood Ghaznawi and had stayed back in Tonk, Rajasthan. He was a son of Hafiz Mahmood Sheerani, a scholar and teacher of high repute, who had started teaching at Islamia College, Lahore in 1921. In 1928, he moved to Oriental College, Lahore. Young Dawood moved to Lahore at a very young age and lived there throughout his life. He did his Munshi Fazil منشی فاضل in 1921 and Adeeb Fazil ادیب فاضل in 1922 (degrees in Arabic and Persian) from Oriental College, Lahore.

Despite the efforts of his father, he could not continue his education and instead became a full-time poet. His teacher in poetry (ustad) was Maulana Tajwar Najibabadi, a well-respected personality in literary circles of Lahore who used to publish literary magazines. Since he had a very common birth name, he adopted Akhtar Sheerani as a pen name.

Works
As to his skill, Akhtar was quite innovative and introduced new trends in Urdu poetry. At a very young age, he wrote mature and inspiring poetry. He was called شاعرِ رومان (the poet of romance). His best-known collections of poetry include Akhtaristan, Nigarshat-e-Akhtar, Lala-e-toor, Tayyur-e-Aawara, Naghma-e-Haram, Subh-e bahaar, and Shahnaz. He had been editor for the literary magazines Intikhab, Bahaaristan, Khyaalistan, and Romaan from 1923 to 1939. He also wrote columns for daily newspapers Hamdard and Zamindar of Maulana Muhammad Ali Johar and Maulana Zafar Ali Khan respectively. He introduced many new writers in his magazines, including Ahmad Nadeem Qasmi and Qudratullah Shahab (both are well-known Urdu writers now). "Chandra Wati", the first afsana (short story) of Qudratullah Shahab, was published in Romaan (Magazine of Akhtar Sheerani).

In total, he left nine collections of his verses. In prose, apart from his fictions and translations, his essays on literary, critical and historical subjects are in abundance. His son, Professor Mehmood Sheerani, who has been teaching in Government College University, has written a book on his life titled Kahan Se Laaoon Unhain (Where can I Find Him?). Yunus Hasni also wrote a book on the life of Akhtar Sheerani.

Style and influence on Urdu poetry

Youth dominates Akhtar's poetry like that of Shelley, Keats, and Byron. Lyricism, subtlety and novelty infuse a new spirit onto his poetry. He exhales a verse as a flower exhales fragrance. His verses touching various colorful subjects flow with such tremendous ease and felicity as the reader is moved to ecstasy. Most of the critics have concentrated only on one aspect of his 'Love Poetry'. However, his work was not confined to just the physical beauty of woman. Woman to him is beautiful in all her forms and shapes; the beloved, the wife, the mother and the sister. Wordsworth, the father of romantic poetry finds the immanence of divine spirit in the objects of nature. Akhtar's depiction of nature is second to none, but unlike Wordsworth, he finds the objects of nature imbued with the beauty of woman. He uses woman as a symbol that stands for beauty and love permeating the whole universe.

Variegated aspects and artistic skills of Akhtar Shairani's poetry lend him a distinguished place in modern Urdu poetry. His influence on Urdu literature, and poetry in particular, earned him a repute of trendsetter.

His famous poems include: 
 "Ae ishq kahin le chal" 
 "O des se aane waale bataa" 
 "Ae ishq hamein barbad na kar" A super-hit poem sung by Nayyara Noor
 "Main aarzoo-e-jaan likhoon ya jaan-e-aarzu"
 "Kuch to tanhai ki raaton ka sahara hota"
 "Barsat"
 "Tumhain sitaron ne be ikhtiar dekha hai"
 "Woh kehtain hain ranjish ki baatain bhula dein", a hit ghazal sung by Malika Pukhraj
 "Woh kabhi mil jayen to kya kijiye", a soulful ghazal sung by Ghulam Ali

Death and legacy
Akhtar Sheerani's life was a succession of tragedies. His young son Javed Mahmood died, his close friend Mirza Shuja Khan committed suicide, his son-in-law Naziruddin Shirani was accidentally drowned, and he was rejected by the woman, named Salma, that he loved. That made him turn to alcohol. On his physical and mental condition, Agha Shorish Kashmiri who was a well known literary, political, and social figure of Lahore, Pakistan at that time, wrote that one was better-off not to see him, since one would be so depressed after seeing him. Excessive drinking took a toll on his health. He was admitted to Mayo Hospital, Lahore on 3 September and died in Lahore on 9 September 1948, just two days before the death of Quaid-e-Azam. While visiting his friend, Hakeem Nayyar Wasty, he died in their home in Masti Gate, Lahore on 9 September 1948.

Pakistan Postal Services issued a commemorative postage stamp in his honor in 2005 in its 'Poets of Pakistan' series.

See also
 Shahab Nama book by Qudratullah Shahab

References

Bibliography

External links
'Ae Ishq Hamein Barbad Na Kar' poem by Akhtar Sheerani sung by Nayyara Noor on YouTube
Poem of Akhtar Sheerani sung by Malika Pukhraj on YouTube
Akhtar Sheerani: Poet of Romance
Akhtar Sheerani: Urdu Description 

1905 births
1948 deaths
Urdu-language poets from Pakistan
Pashtun people
Pakistani poets
Poets from Lahore
Poets in British India
20th-century Urdu-language writers
People from Tonk district
Sonneteers